The 2011 Cleveland Indians season marked the 111th season for the franchise, with the Indians improving on their fourth-place finish in the AL Central in 2010 by finishing in second place in 2011. The team played all of its home games at Progressive Field.

During the offseason, franchise legend and Hall of Fame pitcher Bob Feller died on December 15, 2010. In honor of Feller, the Indians implemented many tributes to their former ace, including all players wearing No. 19 (Feller's jersey number retired by the club in 1957) during pre-game introductions on Opening Day, an outline patch of Feller's pitching motion sewn onto the team's jerseys and to be worn throughout the season, and the press-box seat used by Feller upon retirement made into a memorial.

The 2011 season started off promising for the Cleveland Indians, as they raced out to a 30-15 start (7 games ahead of 2nd place Detroit), but would go 50-67 the rest of the season to slip out of first place, postseason contention, and to another losing record. Still, the Indians' win–loss record improved 11 games from the year before.

Season standings

Record vs opponents

Roster

Game log 

|-  style="text-align:center; background:#fbb;"
| 1 || April 1 || White Sox || 15–10 || Buehrle (1–0) || Carmona (0–1) || || 41,721 || 0–1
|-  style="text-align:center; background:#fbb;"
| 2 || April 2 || White Sox || 8–3 || Jackson (1–0) || Carrasco (0–1) || || 9,853 || 0–2
|- style="text-align:center; background:#bfb;"
| 3 || April 3 || White Sox || 7–1 || Masterson (1–0) || Danks (0–1) || || 8,726 || 1–2
|- style="text-align:center; background:#bfb;"
| 4 || April 5 || Red Sox || 3–1 || Tomlin (1–0) || Beckett (0–1) || C. Perez (1) || 9,025 || 2–2
|- style="text-align:center; background:#bfb;"
| 5 || April 6 || Red Sox || 8–4 || R. Pérez (1–0) || Matsuzaka (0–1) || || 9,523 || 3–2
|- style="text-align:center; background:#bfb;"
| 6 || April 7 || Red Sox || 1–0 || R. Pérez (2–0) || Bard (0–2) || C. Perez (2) || 10,594 || 4–2
|- style="text-align:center; background:#bfb;"
| 7 || April 8 || @ Mariners || 12–3 || Carrasco (1–1) || Vargas (0–1) || || 45,727 || 5–2
|- style="text-align:center; background:#bfb;"
| 8 || April 9 || @ Mariners || 2–1 || Masterson (2–0) || Fister (0–2) || C. Perez (3) || 30,309 || 6–2
|- style="text-align:center; background:#bfb;"
| 9 || April 10 || @ Mariners || 6–4 || Tomlin (2–0) || Bédard (0–2) || C. Perez (4) || 21,128 || 7–2
|- style="text-align:center; background:#bfb;"
| 10 || April 11 || @ Angels || 4–0 || Talbot (1–0) || Chatwood (0–1) || || 32,864 || 8–2
|- style="text-align:center; background:#fbb;"
| 11 || April 12 || @ Angels || 2–0 || Haren (3–0) || Carmona (0–2) || || 43,529 || 8–3
|- style="text-align:center; background:#fbb;"
| 12 || April 13 || @ Angels || 4–3 (12) || Takahashi (1–0) || Durbin (0–1) || || 31,049 || 8–4
|- style="text-align:center; background:#bfb;"
| 13 || April 15 || Orioles || 8–2 || Masterson (3–0) || Britton (2–1) || || 16,346 || 9–4
|- style="text-align:center; background:#bfb;"
| 14 || April 16 || Orioles || 8–3 || Tomlin (3–0) || Guthrie (1–2) || || 10,714 || 10–4
|- style="text-align:center; background:#bfb;"
| 15 || April 17 || Orioles || 4–2 || Carmona (1–2) || Bergesen (0–2) || C. Perez (5) || 13,017 || 11–4
|- style="text-align:center; background:#bfb;"
| 16 || April 18 || @ Royals || 7–3 (10) || Smith (1–0) || Collins (1–1) || || 12,214 || 12–4
|- style="text-align:center; background:#fbb;"
| 17 || April 19 || @ Royals || 5–4 || Chen (3–0) || Gómez (0–1) || Soria (5) || 10,506 || 12–5
|- style="text-align:center; background:#bfb;"
| 18 || April 20 || @ Royals || 7–5 || Masterson (4–0) || Hochevar (2–2)  || C. Perez (6) || 10,080 || 13–5
|- style="text-align:center; background:#fbb;"
| 19 || April 21 || @ Royals || 3–2 || Crow (2–0) || C. Perez (0–1) || || 9,279 || 13–6
|- style="text-align:center; background:#bbb;"
|    || April 22 || @ Twins || colspan=6 | Postponed (rain); Makeup: July 18 (Game 1)
|- style="text-align:center; background:#fbb;"
| 20 || April 23 || @ Twins || 10–3 || Duensing (2–0) || Carmona (1–3) || || 39,459 || 13–7
|- style="text-align:center; background:#fbb;"
| 21 || April 24 || @ Twins || 4–3 || Pavano (2–2) || R. Pérez (2–1) || Capps (4) || 39,388 || 13–8
|- style="text-align:center; background:#bfb;"
| 22 || April 26 || Royals || 9–4 || Masterson (5–0) || Hochevar (2–3) || || 9,650 || 14–8
|- style="text-align:center; background:#bfb;"
| 23 || April 27 || Royals || 7–2 || Tomlin (4–0) || Francis (0–3) || || 9,722 || 15–8
|- style="text-align:center; background:#bfb;"
| 24 || April 28 || Royals || 8–2 || Carmona (2–3) || Davies (1–3) || || 9,076 || 16–8
|- style="text-align:center; background:#bfb;"
| 25 || April 29 || Tigers || 9–5 || C. Perez (1–1) || Benoit (0–1) || || 15,568 || 17–8
|- style="text-align:center; background:#bfb;"
| 26 || April 30 || Tigers || 3–2 (13) || Sipp (1–0) || Villarreal (1–1) || || 26,433 || 18–8
|-

|- style="text-align:center; background:#bfb;"
| 27 || May 1 || Tigers || 5–4 || Durbin (1–1) || Benoit (0–2) || C. Perez (7) || 14,164 || 19–8
|- style="text-align:center; background:#bfb;"
| 28 || May 3 || @ Athletics || 4–1 || Carmona (3–3) || Fuentes (1–3) || C. Perez (8) || 10,135 || 20–8
|- style="text-align:center; background:#fbb;"
| 29 || May 4 || @ Athletics || 3–1 || Cahill (5–0) || Tomlin (4–1) || Balfour (1) || 13,872 || 20–9
|- style="text-align:center; background:#bfb;"
| 30 || May 5 || @ Athletics || 4–3 (12) || Durbin (2–1) || Breslow (0–2) || C. Perez (9) || 14,353 || 21–9
|- style="text-align:center; background:#fbb;"
| 31 || May 6 || @ Angels || 2–1 (11)  || Rodney (1–1) || Germano (0–1) || || 36,447 || 21–10
|- style="text-align:center; background:#bfb;"
| 32 || May 7 || @ Angels || 4–3 || White (1–0) || Weaver (6–2) || C. Perez (10) || 37,684 || 22–10
|- style="text-align:center; background:#fbb;"
| 33 || May 8 || @ Angels || 6–5 || Rodney (2–1) || Smith (1–1) || Walden (6) || 40,124 || 22–11
|- style="text-align:center; background:#bfb;"
| 34 || May 10 || Rays || 5–4 || C. Perez (2–1) || Peralta (1–2) || || 13,551 || 23–11
|- style="text-align:center; background:#fbb;"
| 35 || May 11 || Rays || 8–2 || Price (5–3) || Carrasco (1–2) || || 17,741 || 23–12
|- style="text-align:center; background:#fbb;"
| 36 || May 12 || Rays || 7–4 || Shields (4–1) || Masterson (5–1) || || 18,107 || 23–13
|- style="text-align:center; background:#bfb;"
| 37 || May 13 || Mariners || 5–4 || Sipp (2–0) || League (0–4) || || 33,774 || 24–13
|- style="text-align:center; background:#bbb;"
|    || May 14 || Mariners || colspan=6 | Postponed (rain); Makeup: August 23 (Game 1)
|- style="text-align:center; background:#bbb;"
|    || May 15 || Mariners || colspan=6 | Postponed (rain); Makeup: September 19
|- style="text-align:center; background:#bfb;"
| 38 || May 16 || @ Royals || 19–1 || Tomlin (5–1) || Davies (1–6) || || 12,242 || 25–13
|- style="text-align:center; background:#bfb;"
| 39 || May 17 || @ Royals || 7–3 || Carrasco (2–2) || O'Sullivan (2–3) || || 17,712 || 26–13
|- style="text-align:center; background:#fbb;"
| 40 || May 18 || @ White Sox || 1–0 || Peavy (1–0) || Masterson (5–2) || || 18,580 || 26–14
|- style="text-align:center; background:#fbb;"
| 41 || May 19 || @ White Sox || 8–2 || Floyd (5–3) || Carmona (3–4) || || 22,077 || 26–15
|- style="text-align:center; background:#bfb;"
| 42 || May 20 || Reds || 5–4 || Pestano (1–0) || Bray (1–1) || C. Perez (11) || 31,622 || 27–15
|- style="text-align:center; background:#bfb;"
| 43 || May 21 || Reds || 2–1 || Tomlin (6–1) || Bailey (3–1) || C. Perez (12) || 40,631 || 28–15
|- style="text-align:center; background:#bfb;"
| 44 || May 22 || Reds || 12–4 || Carrasco (3–2) || Vólquez (3–2) || || 26,833 || 29–15
|- style="text-align:center; background:#bfb;"
| 45 || May 23 || Red Sox || 3–2 || Smith (2–1) || Bard (1–4) || C. Perez (13) || 19,225 || 30–15
|- style="text-align:center; background:#fbb;"
| 46 || May 24 || Red Sox || 4–2 || Beckett (4–1) || Carmona (3–5) || Papelbon (9) || 23,752 || 30–16
|- style="text-align:center; background:#fbb;"
| 47 || May 25 || Red Sox || 14–2 || Lester (7–1) || Talbot (1–1) || || 26,408 || 30–17
|- style="text-align:center; background:#fbb;"
| 48 || May 27 || @ Rays || 5–0 || Price (6–4) || Tomlin (6–2) || || 16,800 || 30–18
|- style="text-align:center; background:#bfb;"
| 49 || May 28 || @ Rays || 7–3 || Carrasco (4–2) || Shields (5–3) || C. Perez (14) || 24,717 || 31–18 
|- style="text-align:center; background:#fbb;"
| 50 || May 29 || @ Rays || 7–0 || Hellickson (6–3) || Masterson (5–3) || || 23,898 || 31–19
|- style="text-align:center; background:#fbb;"
| 51 || May 30 || @ Blue Jays || 11–1 || Reyes (1–4) || Carmona (3–6) || || 12,902 || 31–20
|- style="text-align:center; background:#bfb;"
| 52 || May 31 || @ Blue Jays || 6–3 || Talbot (2–1) || Morrow (2–3) || || 14,556 || 32–20
|-

|- style="text-align:center; background:#bfb;"
| 53 || June 1 || @ Blue Jays || 13–9 || Tomlin (7–2) || Drabek (3–4) || || 15,397 || 33–20
|- style="text-align:center; background:#fbb;"
| 54 || June 2 || Rangers || 7–4 || Kirkman (1–0) || Carrasco (4–3) || Feliz (12) || 15,336 || 33–21
|- style="text-align:center; background:#fbb;"
| 55 || June 3 || Rangers || 11–2 || Ogando (6–0) || Masterson (5–4) || || 27,458 || 33–22
|- style="text-align:center; background:#fbb;"
| 56 || June 4 || Rangers || 4–0 || Holland (5–1) || Carmona (3–7) || || 30,130 || 33–23
|- style="text-align:center; background:#fbb;"
| 57 || June 5 || Rangers || 2–0 || Wilson (6–3) || Talbot (2–2) || Feliz (13) || 20,621 || 33–24
|- style="text-align:center; background:#fbb;"
| 58 || June 6 || Twins || 6–4 || Baker (3–4) || Tomlin (7–3) || Capps (8) || 15,278 || 33–25
|- style="text-align:center; background:#bfb;"
| 59 || June 7 || Twins || 1–0 || Carrasco (5–3) || Liriano (3–6) || C. Perez (15) || 15,498 || 34–25
|- style="text-align:center; background:#fbb;"
| 60 || June 8 || Twins || 3–2 (10) || Capps (2–3) || C. Perez (2–2) || Dumatrait (1) || 15,849 || 34–26
|- style="text-align:center; background:#fbb;"
| 61 || June 10 || @ Yankees || 11–7 || Nova (5–4) || Carmona (3–8) || || 45,679 || 34–27
|- style="text-align:center; background:#fbb;"
| 62 || June 11 || @ Yankees || 4–0 || Colón (5–3) || Talbot (2–3) || || 47,048 || 34–28
|- style="text-align:center; background:#fbb;"
| 63 || June 12 || @ Yankees || 9–1 || García (5–5) || Tomlin (7–4) || || 46,791 || 34–29
|- style="text-align:center; background:#bfb;"
| 64 || June 13 || @ Yankees || 1–0 || Carrasco (6–3) || Burnett (6–5) || C. Perez (16) || 43,551 || 35–29
|- style="text-align:center; background:#fbb;"
| 65 || June 14 || @ Tigers || 4–0 || Verlander (8–3) || Masterson (5–5) || || 28,128 || 35–30
|- style="text-align:center; background:#bfb;"
| 66 || June 15 || @ Tigers || 6–4 || Carmona (4–8) || Furbush (1–1) || C. Perez (17) || 26,711 || 36–30
|- style="text-align:center; background:#fbb;"
| 67 || June 16 || @ Tigers || 6–2 || Scherzer (9–2) || Talbot (2–4) || || 37,437 || 36–31
|- style="text-align:center; background:#bfb;"
| 68 || June 17 || Pirates || 5–1 || Tomlin (8–4) || Correia (8–6) || || 38,549 || 37–31
|- style="text-align:center; background:#bfb;"
| 69 || June 18 || Pirates || 5–1 || Carrasco (7–3) || Maholm (3–8) || || 31,865 || 38–31
|- style="text-align:center; background:#bfb;"
| 70 || June 19 || Pirates || 5–2 (11)  || Sipp (3–0) || Wood (0–1) || || 30,023 || 39–31
|- style="text-align:center; background:#fbb;"
| 71 || June 20 || Rockies || 8–7 || Lindstrom (2–1) || Carmona (4–9) || Street (21) || 15,224 || 39–32
|- style="text-align:center; background:#fbb;"
| 72 || June 21 || Rockies || 4–3 || Belisle (5–2) || C. Perez (2–3) || Street (22) || 15,877 || 39–33
|- style="text-align:center; background:#bfb;"
| 73 || June 22 || Rockies || 4–3 || Tomlin (9–4) || Hammel (4–7) || C. Perez (18) || 17,568 || 40–33
|- style="text-align:center; background:#fbb;"
| 74 || June 24 || @ Giants || 4–3 || Casilla (1–1) || Carrasco (7–4) || Wilson (22) || 41,690 || 40–34
|- style="text-align:center; background:#fbb;"
| 75 || June 25 || @ Giants || 1–0 || Cain (7–4) || Masterson (5–6) || Wilson (23) || 42,130 || 40–35
|- style="text-align:center; background:#fbb;"
| 76 || June 26 || @ Giants || 3–1 || Bumgarner (4–9) || Carmona (4–10) || Affeldt (2) || 41,978 || 40–36
|- style="text-align:center; background:#bfb;"
| 77 || June 27 || @ Diamondbacks || 5–4 || R. Pérez (3–1) || Putz (1–2) || C. Perez (19) || 25,726 || 41–36
|- style="text-align:center; background:#fbb;"
| 78 || June 28 || @ Diamondbacks || 6–4 || Castillo (1–0) || Sipp (3–1) || || 27,076 || 41–37
|- style="text-align:center; background:#bfb;"
| 79 || June 29 || @ Diamondbacks || 6–2 || Carrasco (8–4) || Duke (1–3) || || 26,876 || 42–37
|-

|- style="text-align:center; background:#bfb;"
| 80 || July 1 || @ Reds || 8–2 || Masterson (6–6) || Arroyo (7–7) || || 40,440 || 43–37
|- style="text-align:center; background:#bfb;"
| 81 || July 2 || @ Reds || 3–1 || Herrmann (1–0) || Bailey (3–3) || Pestano (1) || 41,580 || 44–37
|- style="text-align:center; background:#fbb;"
| 82 || July 3 || @ Reds || 7–5 || Leake (8–4) || Talbot (2–5) || Cordero (17) || 34,948 || 44–38
|- style="text-align:center; background:#bfb;"
| 83 || July 4 || Yankees || 6–3 || Tomlin (10–4) || Burnett (8–7) || C. Perez (20) || 40,676 || 45–38
|- style="text-align:center; background:#fbb;"
| 84 || July 5 || Yankees || 9–2 || Sabathia (12–4) || Carrasco (8–5) || || 30,100 || 45–39
|- style="text-align:center; background:#bfb;"
| 85 || July 6 || Yankees || 5–3 || Masterson (7–6) || Hughes (0–2) || C. Perez (21) || 31,926 || 46–39
|- style="text-align:center; background:#bfb;"
| 86 || July 7 || Blue Jays || 5–4 || Sipp (4–1) || Pérez (1–2) || || 18,816 || 47–39
|- style="text-align:center; background:#fbb;"
| 87 || July 8 || Blue Jays || 11–7 || Reyes (4–7) || Talbot (2–6)  || || 25,835 || 47–40
|- style="text-align:center; background:#fbb;"
| 88 || July 9 || Blue Jays || 5–4 (10) || Rauch (3–3) || C. Perez (2–4) || Camp (1) || 27,661 || 47–41
|- style="text-align:center; background:#fbb;"
| 89 || July 10 || Blue Jays || 7–1 || Cecil (2–4) || Carrasco (8–6) || || 21,148 || 47–42
|- style="text-align:center; background:#bfb;"
| 90 || July 14 || @ Orioles || 8–4 || Masterson (8–6) || Guthrie (3–13) || || 22,780 || 48–42
|- style="text-align:center; background:#bfb;"
| 91 || July 15 || @ Orioles || 6–5 || Tomlin (11–4) || Johnson (5–3) || C. Perez (22) || 27,352 || 49–42
|- style="text-align:center; background:#fbb;"
| 92 || July 16 || @ Orioles || 6–5 || Simón (2–2) || Carrasco (8–7) || Gonzalez (1) || 24,835 || 49–43
|- style="text-align:center; background:#fbb;"
| 93 || July 17 || @ Orioles || 8–3 || Hendrickson (1–0) || Gómez (0–2) || || 17,754 || 49–44
|- style="text-align:center; background:#bfb;"
| 94 || July 18 || @ Twins || 5–2 || Huff (1–0) || Swarzak (2–3) || Pestano (2) || 39,768 || 50–44
|- style="text-align:center; background:#bfb;"
| 95 || July 18 || @ Twins || 6–3 || Carmona (5–10) || Diamond (0–1) || || 38,491 || 51–44
|- style="text-align:center; background:#fbb;"
| 96 || July 19 || @ Twins || 2–1 || Perkins (2–1) || C. Perez (2–5) || || 38,473 || 51–45
|- style="text-align:center; background:#fbb;"
| 97 || July 20 || @ Twins || 7–5 || Capps (3–5) || Sipp (4–2) || Nathan (6) || 39,167 || 51–46
|- style="text-align:center; background:#fbb;"
| 98 || July 22 || White Sox || 3–0 || Floyd (8–9) || Carrasco (8–8) || Santos (19) || 27,477 || 51–47
|- style="text-align:center; background:#bbb;"
| || July 23 || White Sox ||  colspan=6 | Postponed (rain); Makeup: September 20 (Game 1)
|- style="text-align:center; background:#fbb;"
| 99 || July 24 || White Sox || 4–2 || Jackson (7–7) || Masterson (8–7) || Santos (20) || 20,252 || 51–48
|- style="text-align:center; background:#bfb;"
| 100 || July 25 || Angels || 3–2 || Sipp (5–2) || Walden (2–3) || || 19,384 || 52–48
|- style="text-align:center; background:#fbb;"
| 101 || July 26 || Angels || 2–1 || Weaver (14–4) || Tomlin (11–5) || Walden (24) || 19,430 || 52–49
|- style="text-align:center; background:#fbb;"
| 102 || July 27 || Angels || 3–1 || Santana (6–8) || Huff (1–1) || || 21,546 || 52–50
|- style="text-align:center; background:#fbb;"
| 103 || July 29 || Royals || 12–0 || Francis (4–11) || Carrasco (8–9) || || 35,390 || 52–51
|- style="text-align:center; background:#bfb;"
| 104 || July 30 || Royals || 5–2 || Sipp (6–2) || Soria (5–4) || || 31,436 || 53–51
|- style="text-align:center; background:#fbb;"
| 105 || July 31 || Royals || 5–3 || Duffy (3–4) || Carmona (5–11) || Soria (20) || 21,101 || 53–52
|-

|- style="text-align:center; background:#bfb;"
| 106 || August 1 || @ Red Sox || 9–6 || R. Pérez (4–1) || Bard (1–5) ||  || 37,943 || 54–52
|- style="text-align:center; background:#fbb;"
| 107 || August 2 || @ Red Sox || 3–2 || Papelbon (3–0) || Pestano (1–1) || || 38,101 || 54–53
|- style="text-align:center; background:#fbb;"
| 108 || August 3 || @ Red Sox || 4–3 || Papelbon (4–0) || Smith (2–2) || || 38,172 || 54–54
|- style="text-align:center; background:#bfb;"
| 109 || August 4 || @ Red Sox || 7–3 || Masterson (9–7) || Morales (0–2) || || 38,477 || 55–54
|- style="text-align:center; background:#fbb;"
| 110 || August 5 || @ Rangers || 8–7 (11) || Feliz (1–2) || R. Pérez (4–2) || || 37,842 || 55–55
|- style="text-align:center; background:#bfb;"
| 111 || August 6 || @ Rangers || 7–5 || Herrmann (2–0) || Feliz (1–3) || C. Perez (23) || 38,210 || 56–55
|- style="text-align:center; background:#fbb;"
| 112 || August 7 || @ Rangers || 5–3 || Oliver (4–5) || Smith (2–3) || Adams (1) || 37,431 || 56–56
|- style="text-align:center; background:#bfb;"
| 113 || August 9 || Tigers || 3–2 (14) || Herrmann (3–0) || Pauley (5–5) || || 25,317 || 57–56
|- style="text-align:center; background:#bfb;"
| 114 || August 10 || Tigers || 10–3 || Jiménez (1–0) || Porcello (11–7) || || 23,258 || 58–56
|- style="text-align:center; background:#fbb;"
| 115 || August 11 || Tigers || 4–3 || Verlander (17–5) || Carmona (5–12) || Valverde (33) || 30,988 || 58–57
|- style="text-align:center; background:#bfb;"
| 116 || August 12 || Twins || 3–2 || R. Pérez (5–2) || Perkins (4–3) || C. Perez (24) || 31,364 || 59–57
|- style="text-align:center; background:#bfb;"
| 117 || August 13 || Twins || 3–1 || Tomlin (12–5) || Duensing (8–11) || C. Perez (25) || 30,619 || 60–57
|- style="text-align:center; background:#bbb;"
| || August 14 || Twins || colspan=6 | Postponed (rain); Makeup: September 24 (Game 1)
|- style="text-align:center; background:#fbb;"
| 118 || August 16 || @ White Sox || 8–7 (14) || Frasor (3–2) || Durbin (2–2) || || 24,695 || 60–58
|- style="text-align:center; background:#bfb;"
| 119 || August 17 || @ White Sox || 4–1 || Carmona (6–12) || Buehrle (10–6) || C. Perez (26) || 25,029 || 61–58
|- style="text-align:center; background:#bfb;"
| 120 || August 18 || @ White Sox || 4–2 || Masterson (10–7) || Ohman (0–3) || C. Perez (27) || 27,079 || 62–58
|- style="text-align:center; background:#fbb;"
| 121 || August 19 || @ Tigers || 4–1 || Scherzer (13–7) || Tomlin (12–6) || Valverde (36) || 44,222 || 62–59
|- style="text-align:center; background:#fbb;"
| 122 || August 20 || @ Tigers || 10–1 || Fister (5–13) || Huff (1–2) || || 44,629 || 62–60
|- style="text-align:center; background:#fbb;"
| 123 || August 21 || @ Tigers || 8–7 || Coke (2–8) || Jiménez (1–1) || Valverde (37) || 43,388 || 62–61
|- style="text-align:center; background:#fbb;"
| 124 || August 22 || Mariners || 3–2 || Ruffin (1–0) || C. Perez (2–6) || League (31) || 21,582 || 62–62
|- style="text-align:center; background:#bfb;"
| 125 || August 23 || Mariners || 7–5 || C. Perez (3–6) || League (1–5) || || 22,805 || 63–62
|- style="text-align:center; background:#fbb;"
| 126 || August 23 || Mariners || 12–7 || Vasquez (1–0) || McAllister (0–1) || Gray (1) || 22,590 || 63–63
|- style="text-align:center; background:#fbb;"
| 127 || August 24 || Mariners || 9–2 || Hernández (12–11) || Tomlin (12–7) || || 16,037 || 63–64
|- style="text-align:center; background:#bfb;"
| 128 || August 26 || Royals || 2–1 || Jiménez (2–1) || Paulino (2–10) || C. Perez (28) || 41,337 || 64–64
|- style="text-align:center; background:#bfb;"
| 129 || August 27 || Royals || 8–7 || Smith (3–3) || Coleman (1–4) || C. Perez (29) || 35,370 || 65–64
|- style="text-align:center; background:#fbb;"
| 130 || August 28 || Royals || 2–1 || Chen (10–5) || Masterson (10–8) || Soria (24) || 27,908 || 65–65
|- style="text-align:center; background:#bfb;"
| 131 || August 29 || Athletics || 2–1 || Huff (2–2) || McCarthy (7–7) || C. Perez (30) || 18,201 || 66–65
|- style="text-align:center; background:#bfb;"
| 132 || August 30 || Athletics || 6–2 || Gómez (1–2) || Cahill (9–13) || || 20,372 || 67–65
|- style="text-align:center; background:#bfb;"
| 133 || August 31 || Athletics || 4–3 (16) || Herrmann (4–0) || Outman (3–4) || || 15,202 || 68–65
|-

|- style="text-align:center; background:#fbb;"
| 134 || September 1 || Athletics || 7–0 || Gonzalez (12–11) || Carmona (6–13) || || 14,192 || 68–66
|- style="text-align:center; background:#bfb;"
| 135 || September 2 || @ Royals || 5–4 || Masterson (11–8) || Chen (10–6) || C. Perez (31) || 27,251 || 69–66
|- style="text-align:center; background:#fbb;"
| 136 || September 3 || @ Royals || 5–1 || Hochevar (10–10) || Huff (2–3) || || 27,126 || 69–67
|- style="text-align:center; background:#bfb;"
| 137 || September 4 || @ Royals || 9–6 || Gómez (2–2) || Francis (5–15) || C. Perez (32) || 34,015 || 70–67
|- style="text-align:center; background:#fbb;"
| 138 || September 5 || Tigers || 4–2 || Fister (7–13) || Jiménez (2–2) || Valverde (41) || 39,824 || 70–68
|- style="text-align:center; background:#fbb;"
| 139 || September 6 || Tigers || 10–1 || Porcello (13–8) || Carmona (6–14) || || 27,544 || 70–69
|- style="text-align:center; background:#fbb;"
| 140 || September 7 || Tigers || 8–6 || Verlander (22–5) || Masterson (11–9) || Valverde (42) || 16,783 || 70–70
|- style="text-align:center; background:#fbb;"
| 141 || September 8 || @ White Sox || 8–1 || Thornton (1–4) || Huff (2–4) || || 22,063 || 70–71
|- style="text-align:center; background:#bfb;"
| 142 || September 9 || @ White Sox || 8–4 || Gómez (3–2) || Buehrle (11–8) || || 26,711 || 71–71
|- style="text-align:center; background:#fbb;"
| 143 || September 10 || @ White Sox || 7–3 (10) || Santos (4–4) || C. Perez (3–7) || || 26,719 || 71–72
|- style="text-align:center; background:#bfb;"
| 144 || September 11 || @ White Sox || 7–3 || Jiménez (3–2) || Stewart (2–4) || || 22,319 || 72–72
|- style="text-align:center; background:#fbb;"
| 145 || September 13 || @ Rangers || 10–4 || Harrison (12–9) || Masterson (11–10) || || 30,107 || 72–73
|- style="text-align:center; background:#fbb;"
| 146 || September 14 || @ Rangers || 9–1 || Holland (14–5) || Huff (2–5) || || 38,710 || 72–74
|- style="text-align:center; background:#fbb;"
| 147 || September 15 || @ Rangers || 7–4 || Ogando (13–8) || Carmona (6–15) || || 44,242 || 72–75
|- style="text-align:center; background:#bfb;"
| 148 || September 16 || @ Twins || 7–6 || Jiménez (4–2) || Slowey (0–6) || C. Perez (33) || 37,942 || 73–75
|- style="text-align:center; background:#bfb;"
| 149 || September 17 || @ Twins || 10–4 || Gómez (4–2) || Swarzak (3–7) || || 38,805 || 74–75
|- style="text-align:center; background:#bfb;"
| 150 || September 18 || @ Twins || 6–5 || Masterson (12–10) || Pavano (8–13) || C. Perez (34) || 37,012 || 75–75
|- style="text-align:center; background:#fbb;"
| 151 || September 19 || Mariners || 12–6 (7) || Furbush (4–9) || Huff (2–6) || || 15,354 || 75–76
|- style="text-align:center; background:#bfb;"
| 152 || September 20 || White Sox || 4–3 || Carmona (7–15) || Floyd (12–12) || C. Perez (35) || 28,603 || 76–76
|- style="text-align:center; background:#fbb;"
| 153 || September 20 || White Sox || 5–4 || Thornton (2–5) || Putnam (0–1) || Sale (7) || 19,582 || 76–77
|- style="text-align:center; background:#fbb;"
| 154 || September 21 || White Sox || 8–4 || Buehrle (12–9) || Jiménez (4–3) || || 12,400 || 76–78
|- style="text-align:center; background:#bfb;"
| 155 || September 22 || White Sox || 11–2 || Gómez (5–2) || Humber (9–9) || || 21,487 || 77–78
|- style="text-align:center; background:#bfb;"
| 156 || September 23 || Twins || 6–5 || C. Perez (4–7) || Capps (4–7) || || 36,807 || 78–78
|- style="text-align:center; background:#bfb;"
| 157 || September 24 || Twins || 8–2 || Putnam (1–1) || Liriano (9–10) || || 26,197 || 79–78
|- style="text-align:center; background:#bfb;"
| 158 || September 24 || Twins || 7–6 || Hagadone (1–0) || Mijares (0–2) || C. Perez (36) || 30,748 || 80–78
|- style="text-align:center; background:#fbb;"
| 159 || September 25 || Twins || 6–4 (10) || Waldrop (1–0) || Sipp (6–3) || Nathan (14) || 22,539 || 80–79
|- style="text-align:center; background:#fbb;"
| 160 || September 26 || @ Tigers || 14–0 || Fister (11–13) || Jiménez (4–4) || || 29,886 || 80–80
|- style="text-align:center; background:#fbb;"
| 161 || September 27 || @ Tigers || 9–6 || Scherzer (15–9) || Gómez (5–3) || Valverde (48) || 31,132 || 80–81
|- style="text-align:center; background:#fbb;"
| 162 || September 28 || @ Tigers || 5–4 || Perry (2–0) || Pestano (1–2) || Valverde (49) || 31,645 || 80–82
|-

Player stats

Batting
Note: G = Games played; AB = At bats; R = Runs scored; H = Hits; 2B = Doubles; 3B = Triples; HR = Home runs; RBI = Runs batted in; AVG = Batting average; SB = Stolen bases

Pitching
Note: W = Wins; L = Losses; ERA = Earned run average; G = Games pitched; GS = Games started; SV = Saves; IP = Innings pitched; H = Hits allowed; R = Runs allowed; ER = Earned runs allowed; BB = Walks allowed; K = Strikeouts

Notes/Records
 The crowd of 9,853 on April 2 set a Progressive Field record for lowest attendance in the stadium's history.  This record was broken a day later with an attendance of 8,726.
 On April 29, the Indians set a franchise record with their 17 April win. They broke the record again the next day, ending April with 18 wins.
 The Indians tied a franchise record best start thru 30 games, going 21-9.
 The Indians had their best start at home in franchise history, going 14-2.
 Shortstop Asdrúbal Cabrera and pitcher Chris Perez were selected for the 2011 Major League Baseball All-Star Game, the first selection for both players. Cabrera was named the starting shortstop when Derek Jeter pulled out due to injury.
 On July 27, Ervin Santana of the Los Angeles Angels of Anaheim pitched a no-hitter against the Indians, allowing an unearned run in a 3-1 win. He struck out 10 and allowed one walk. It is the first no-hitter thrown in the history of Progressive Field since it opened in 1994.
 On August 3, second baseman Jason Kipnis became the first player in MLB history to hit a home run in four consecutive games within two weeks of his major league debut.
 On August 4, Justin Masterson struck out four batters in the second inning against the Boston Red Sox, the 56th occurrence in MLB history.
 On August 31, the Indians and Oakland Athletics combined for 39 strikeouts, a Progressive Field record.

Farm system

LEAGUE CHAMPIONS: Columbus

References

External links

2011 Cleveland Indians Season Official Site
2011 Cleveland Indians season at Baseball Reference

Cleveland Indians
Cleveland Guardians seasons
Cleve